Smely (Cyrillic: Смелый, alternative spelling Smelyi) has been the name of more than one destroyer of the Soviet Navy:

 , a  commissioned on 31 May 1941 and sunk on 27 July 1941
 , a  commissioned on 21 December 1949 and sunk as a target in November 1960

Soviet Navy ship names
Russian Navy ship names